John Boning (21 September 1805 – 12 April 1879) was an English first-class cricketer associated with Cambridge Town Club who was active from 1822 to 1847. He is recorded in 35 matches, totalling 657 runs with a highest score of 65 and holding 36 catches. He took 54 wickets, achieving five wickets in an innings on six occasions and once took ten wickets in a match.

References

English cricketers
English cricketers of 1787 to 1825
English cricketers of 1826 to 1863
Cambridge Town Club cricketers
1805 births
1879 deaths